{{DISPLAYTITLE:Omicron1 Cancri}}

Omicron1 Cancri, Latinised from ο1 Cancri, is a solitary, white-hued star in the zodiac constellation of Cancer. It is visible to the naked eye with an apparent visual magnitude of +5.20. Based upon an annual parallax shift of 21.87 mas as seen from Earth, this star is located around 149 light-years from the Sun. It most likely forms a co-moving pair with Omicron2 Cancri.

With a stellar classification of A5 III, this appears to be an evolved, A-type giant star. At the age of about 600 million years, it has double the mass of the Sun and 1.86 times the Sun's radius.

Omicron1 Cancri has an infrared excess, indicating it surrounded by a circumstellar debris disk. The signature matches a two-component disk with the spatially separated belts having temperatures of 146 K and 81 K.

References

A-type giants
Cancri, Omicron1
Cancer (constellation)
Durchmusterung objects
Cancri, 62
076543
043970
3561